Anna Godenius (born 24 July 1944) is a Swedish actress. She has appeared in more than 35 films and television shows since 1975.

Selected filmography
 Egg! Egg! A Hardboiled Story (1975)
 A Guy and a Gal (1975)
 Svart Lucia (1992)
 Stockholm East (2011)

References

External links

1944 births
Living people
20th-century Swedish actresses
21st-century Swedish actresses
Swedish film actresses
Swedish television actresses
People from Köping